The 1992 Intercontinental Cup was an association football match played on 13 December 1992, between FC Barcelona, winners of the 1991–92 European Cup, and São Paulo, winners of the 1992 Copa Libertadores. The match was played at the National Stadium in Tokyo. It was both Barcelona and São Paulo's first appearances into the competition. São Paulo won the match 2–1.

Raí was named as man of the match.

Venue

Match details

Man of the Match:
Raí (São Paulo)

See also
1991–92 European Cup
1992 Copa Libertadores
FC Barcelona in international football competitions

References

Intercontinental Cup
Intercontinental Cup
Intercontinental Cup
Intercontinental Cup (football)
Intercontinental Cup
Intercontinental Cup
Intercontinental Cup (football) matches hosted by Japan
Inter
Inter
Sports competitions in Tokyo
December 1992 sports events in Asia
1992 in Tokyo
1992 in association football